Julius Pongla Akosah ( Akosah, born ) is a former Cameroon-born Hong Kong professional footballer who currently plays as an amateur for Hong Kong Second Division club Fu Moon. His position was striker. He was once called up by Cameroon in 2006. Hong Kong football fans commonly use Agumon as a nickname for him because of his transcriptional name.

Club career
Akosah has played for a few clubs in Hong Kong First Division League including Buler Rangers, Sun Hei, Kitchee and Eastern. In summer 2009, Akosah returned to Sun Hei as Eastern self-relegated to the Third Division League.

Spending a year in Sun Hei, Akosah decided not to extend his contract with Sun Hei. On 12 August 2010, The Jakarta Globe reports that Indonesian Super League club Persija Jakarta said it had secured the services of Julius Akosah.

Akosah returned to Sun Hei in September 2011, but on 5 January 2012, Sun Hei released him and he moved to Tuen Mun. Akosah scored in the 60th minute on his debut for Tuen Mun on 7 January 2012 against Tai Po, but the match ended 1–1.

International career
Akosah's outstanding performance in 2005 AFC Cup caught the attention of the coach of the Cameroon national football team. He was called for the training squad for 2006 Africa Cup of Nations but was left out of the final squad.

In 2009, Akosah became a permanent resident of Hong Kong and applied for a Hong Kong passport, but his application failed, so he is not eligible to play for the Hong Kong football team in international matches. Akosah made his debut for Hong Kong on 29 December 2009 in the Guangdong-Hong Kong Cup. He scored twice to secure a 2:1 victory for Hong Kong at Siu Sai Wan Sports Ground. In the 2nd leg Guangdong-Hong Kong Cup match, on 2 January 2010, he received his first red card for Hong Kong.

Honours

Club

Sun Hei
Hong Kong First Division League
Winner: 2003–04, 2004–05
Hong Kong League Cup
Winner: 2003–04, 2004–05
Hong Kong Senior Shield
Winner: 2004–05
Hong Kong FA Cup
Winner: 2004–05, 2005–06

Kitchee
Hong Kong League Cup
Winner: 2006–07

Individual

Hong Kong First Division League Top Scorer: 2003–04
Hong Kong Senior Shield Top Scorer: 2003–04
Hong Kong FA Cup Top Scorer: 2003–04

Statistics

Club
As of 28 July 2010

References

External links
Julius Akosah at HKFA
Profile at Kitchee.com 

1982 births
Living people
Cameroonian footballers
Hong Kong footballers
Cameroonian emigrants to Hong Kong
Hong Kong people of Cameroonian descent
Hong Kong Rangers FC players
Sun Hei SC players
Kitchee SC players
Eastern Sports Club footballers
Expatriate footballers in Indonesia
Hong Kong First Division League players
Expatriate footballers in Hong Kong
Happy Valley AA players
Naturalized footballers of Hong Kong
Association football forwards